There are over 20,000 Grade II* listed buildings in England. This page is a list of these buildings in the metropolitan borough of Calderdale in West Yorkshire.

List

|}

See also
 Grade I listed buildings in West Yorkshire
 Grade II* listed buildings in West Yorkshire
 Grade II* listed buildings in Bradford
 Grade II* listed buildings in Kirklees
 Grade II* listed buildings in Leeds
 Grade II* listed buildings in Wakefield

Notes

External links

 
Lists of Grade II* listed buildings in West Yorkshire